Kenya competed at the 2022 World Athletics Championships in Eugene, United States, from 15 to 24 July 2022. The country finished in 4th place in the medal table.

Medalists

Results
Kenya entered 45 athletes.

Men 
Track and road events

 Field events

Women 
Track and road events

References

Kenya
World Championships in Athletics
2022